Time to Live is a 1969 French drama film directed by Bernard Paul. It was entered into the 6th Moscow International Film Festival.

Cast
 Marina Vlady as Marie
 Frédéric de Pasquale as Louis
 Catherine Allégret as Catherine
 Françoise Godde as Angelina, la serveuse
 Chris Avram as Michel Casno
 Yves Afonso as René
 Georges Staquet as Enrico
 Boudjema Bouhada as Mohammed
 Louise Rioton as La belle-mère de Louis
 Anne Guillard as Corinne
 Eric Damain as Jean-Marc

References

External links
 

1969 films
1969 drama films
French drama films
1960s French-language films
1960s French films